The 1998 JJB Super League Grand Final was the first staging of the Super League Grand Final and the conclusive and championship-deciding game of 1998's Super League III, and the first Grand Final of the Super League era. It was held on Saturday 24 October 1998, at Old Trafford, Manchester, United Kingdom. This was the first time the League Championship had been decided by play-off since the 1972–73 Championship Final. The game was played between Wigan Warriors and Leeds Rhinos.

Background

JJB Sports Super League III was the official name for the year 1998's Super League championship season, the 104th season of top-level professional rugby league football in Britain, and the third championship run by Super League. The League format changed in 1998 and the championship became a play off series to determine the Super League champions, similar to the way the Premiership was played a few seasons earlier. This meant the first Final to determine the British champions since the 1972–73 season. Huddersfield Giants, the league's bottom club was saved from relegation in 1998 due to the expansion of the league to fourteen teams in Super League IV.

Route to the Grand Final

Wigan Warriors

By finishing  first in the regular season, Wigan qualified directly to the play-off semi-finals. They were drawn against Leeds at home and beat their eventual Grand Final opponents 17–4.

Leeds Rhinos
The play-off system in use only gave the league leaders a bye to the semi-finals. Leeds had finished second so had to play a qualifying play-off first. Drawn at home to  Halifax Blue Sox Leeds won 13–6 to go through to the semi-final. This was an away fixture to Wigan where the Rhinos were beaten 17–4. However this loss did not end their season. The losers of the qualifying semi-final got another chance by playing the winners of the other semi-final in a final eliminator. Therefore Leeds' third play-off game was  a home tie against St Helens where they cruised through 44–16.

Match details

See also
Super League III

References

External links
1998 Super League Grand Final at wigan.rlfans.com
1998 Super League Grand Final at rlphotos.com

Leeds Rhinos matches
Wigan Warriors matches
Super League Grand Finals
Grand final
Super League Grand Final
Super League Grand Final